Syed Asrar Shah (born 20 April 1985) is a Pakistani singer-songwriter, musician, composer and writer based in Lahore. Officially managed by Syed Noman Alam 

Asrar was born on 20 April 1985 and later in 1992 his family moved to Hyderabad, Sindh, and then to Lahore in 2007. From an early age, he was inspired by Sufi music and started writing his songs. 

Asrar received training from Ustad Sultan Ahmed Khan in Hyderabad then in 2007 he moved to Lahore where he participated and stood first in Pakistan Musical Conference. In 2011 he released his debut single "Nai Saiyyo". He joined the television program Coke Studio  in 2014 and released his song "Sub Aakho Ali Ali" during the show.
 Previously he also sang a Kalam from Bang-e-Dara by Muhammad Iqbal, "Terey Ishq ki Inteha chahta hun".

He made his Bollywood debut in July 2015 with a song Afghan Jalebi for the film Phantom. Asrar has also started his own music production company named Soul Speaks and now working as Raagbaaz.

He also sang OSTs for famous drama serials Cheekh and Parizaad's OST, which were highly appreciated by the public.

Discography

See also 
 Sufi music
Pakistani pop music
Pakistani Sufism
 Coke Studio Pakistan (Season 7)

References

External links 

Punjabi music
Pakistani musicians
Performers of Sufi music
Kashmiri people
1985 births
Living people
Musicians from Lahore
Pakistani male singers
People from Kotli District